The following list of people were born in Hebron.

 Yoav Goldstein, a Gold Dealer and a Martyr from the 4th Century BCE that was born in the city of Hebron. Known as the Forefather of the Goldstein Clan
 Basel Adra, 21st-century journalist
 Abraham Konki, 17th-century Hebronite rabbi
 Chaim Hezekiah Medini, Rabbi and author of Sdei Chemed. Buried in Old Jewish cemetery, Hebron.
 Hayyim ben Jacob Abulafia, 17th-century renewer of Jewish settlement in Tiberias
 Fadi Elsalameen, Palestinian activist and blogger
 Raphael Hayyim Isaac Carregal, 18th-century Hebronite and rabbi, friend of Yale president Ezra Stiles
 Hasan Hourani, Palestinian artist
 Mazen Dana,  Palestinian journalist killed by United States soldiers in Baghdad
 Muhammad Ali Ja'abari, long-serving mayor of Hebron
 Sulaiman Ja'abari, former Grand Mufti of Jerusalem
 Yitzhaq Shami, Jewish-Israeli writer whose characters who were often Arabs or Sephardic Jews

 
Hebron
Hebron
Rabbis in Hebron
Hebron